Arenicolidae is a family of marine polychaete worms. They are commonly known as lugworms and the little coils of sand they produce are commonly seen on the beach. Arenicolids are found worldwide, mostly living in burrows in sandy substrates. Most are detritivores but some graze on algae.

Description

The arenicolids are characterised by an elongated cylindrical body separated into two or three distinct regions. The prostomium has no appendages or palps. There are one or two anterior segments without setae. On the other segments, all the setae are unbranched, including the capillary setae and the rostrate uncini. The notopodia are bluntly truncate and the neuropodia are elongated tori forming long transverse welts in some of the setigers. The notosetae have either a capillary function or act as limbs and the neurosetae are rostrate hooks. There are branchiae present on some of the setigers in the middle or posterior regions. Apart from the genus Branchiomaldane, the lugworms are not easy to confuse with other polychaetes. Their tough cuticle and their distinct branchial region with strongly tufted branchiae are characteristic.

Classification
The family Arenicolidae contains 4 genera and 24 species.
 Abarenicola  – 11 species
 Arenicola  – 7 species
 Arenicolides  – 2 species
 Branchiomaldane  – 4 species
There are also three uncertain genera.
 Clymenides
 Eruca
 Protocapitella

See also
 Arenicola marina
 Abarenicola pacifica

References

External links

Polychaetes
Taxa named by George Johnston (naturalist)
Annelid families